

Events
 December 21 – The first game of basketball is played at the Springfield YMCA Training School under the rules of James Naismith.

References